Manbij Subdistrict  is a subdistrict of Manbij District in Aleppo Governorate of northern Syria. The administrative centre is the city of Manbij.

At the 2004 census, the subdistrict had a population of 204,766.

Cities, towns and villages

References 

Manbij District
Manbij